Mitchell John McClenaghan (born 11 June 1986) is a New Zealand international cricketer who plays limited over internationals for New Zealand. Domestically, he plays for Otago in New Zealand. McClenaghan is a left-arm medium-fast bowler. He is the fastest bowler to take 50 wickets for New Zealand in One Day Internationals.

International career
McClenaghan made his international debut in a T20I against South Africa on 21 December 2012 when New Zealand toured the country. He took his maiden T20I wicket of South Africa’s opener Richard Levi in the same match and finished with the figures of 1/20 from his three overs. He played in all three T20I matches of the series and took a total of 4 wickets in his maiden T20I series.

McClenaghan made his ODI debut in the same tour against South Africa on 19 January 2013. He finished the match with an excellent figures of 4-20 from his ten overs, the best bowling figures by a New Zealand debutant and becoming only the second New Zealander after Dayle Hadlee to take four wickets on ODI debut. He played in all three ODI’s of the series, finishing with a total of 6 wickets to become the joint highest wicket-taker for New Zealand in that ODI series along with Kane Williamson who also took 6 wickets in the series.

In May 2013, McClenaghan was named in New Zealand’s 15 man ODI squad for the 2013 Champions Trophy. He played in New Zealand’s all three matches of the tournament and picked up a total of 11 wickets with a best bowling figures of 4-43 and ended the tournament as the second highest wicket-taker after Ravindra Jadeja who took 12 wickets in the tournament.

On 24 October 2014, against South Africa in the second ODI, McClenaghan became the fastest New Zealander and joint second fastest of all time to reach 50 ODI wickets in terms of matches. He achieved the feat in his 23rd ODI match with the wicket of Quinton de Kock.

Cricket World Cup 2015
In January 2015, McClenaghan was named in New Zealand’s 15 man ODI squad for the 2015 Cricket World Cup. But the depth of New Zealand's pace resources only allowed him one match during New Zealand’s surge to the final. He played his only World Cup match against Bangladesh on 13 March 2015 where he picked up figures of 0-68 from his 8 overs.

Twenty20 World Cup 2016
In January 2016, McClenaghan was named in New Zealand’s 15 man T20I squad for the 2016 Twenty World Cup. He played a total of 4 matches in the tournament and picked up a total of 4 wickets at an average of 21.75 with a best bowling figures of 3-17 against Australia.

Champions Trophy 2017
In April 2017, McClenaghan was named in New Zealand’s 15 man ODI squad for the 2017 Champions Trophy. But he didn’t feature in New Zealand’s any three matches of the tournament.

Giving up New Zealand contract
In August 2017, McClenaghan gave up New Zealand contract in order to pursue overseas T20 league career. He was eligible for selection for New Zealand whenever available in the future. He was replaced by Lockie Ferguson in New Zealand’s central contract list.

World XI
In May 2018, McClenaghan was named in ICC’s World XI squad to face the West Indies in a one-off T20I at the Lord’s. The T20I was granted international status by the ICC and was played to raise funds for two stadiums damaged by two hurricanes in September 2017 in the Caribbean and was named as Hurricane Relief T20 Challenge. McClenaghan played in the match and finished with the figures of 0-31 from his three overs. It was the last ever international match for McClenaghan till date.

Domestic career
In 2009, in a non-first-class match, McClenaghan took 5/36 against the England Lions for New Zealand Emerging Players.

It was announced on 14 June 2013 that McClenaghan would be joining Lancashire as an overseas player for their Friends Life t20 campaign. He was awarded the Player of the Match award in his first home match at Old Trafford against Nottinghamshire after taking five wickets for just 29 runs.

On 19 May 2015, McClenaghan joined Middlesex as an overseas player for their final six T20 Blast group matches, replacing South African Kyle Abbott from the end of June 2015. He made his debut against Sussex at Lord's on 2 July 2015 and took eight wickets in four appearances, including 3/24 on his debut.

McClenaghan was the leading wicket-taker for Auckland in the 2018–19 Ford Trophy, with fifteen dismissals in nine matches.

T20 franchise career
McClenaghan made his Indian Premier League debut in 2015, when he was bought by Mumbai Indians and took 14 wickets at a bowling average of 22.50 runs per wicket in 10 appearances. He played with the franchise in the 2016 and 2017 editions. After going unsold in the 2018 auction, McClenaghan was selected by the Mumbai Indians as a replacement for the injured Jason Behrendorff.

In September 2018, McClenaghan was named in Nangarhar's squad in the first edition of the Afghanistan Premier League tournament.

Records and achievements
 Best bowling figures by a New Zealand ODI debutant (4-20).
Only the second New Zealander after Dayle Hadlee to take four wickets on ODI debut.
Second highest wicket-taker in the 2013 Champions Trophy (11).
Fastest New Zealander and joint second fastest of all time to reach 50 ODI wickets in terms of matches (23).

References

External links
 

1986 births
Auckland cricketers
Central Districts cricketers
Cricketers at the 2015 Cricket World Cup
Lancashire cricketers
Living people
Middlesex cricketers
Mumbai Indians cricketers
New Zealand cricketers
New Zealand One Day International cricketers
New Zealand Twenty20 International cricketers
Worcestershire cricketers
Saint Lucia Kings cricketers
Sydney Thunder cricketers
Lahore Qalandars cricketers
Karachi Kings cricketers
World XI Twenty20 International cricketers
Nangarhar Leopards cricketers
North Island cricketers
Otago cricketers